Stuff is a 12-minute documentary about the house of Red Hot Chili Peppers guitarist John Frusciante. It was made in 1993 by Johnny Depp and Gibby Haynes, the lead singer of the Butthole Surfers. Dr. Timothy Leary is also present in the video. The film's main purpose was to depict the chaos and instability of Frusciante's life.

The film once aired in the Dutch TV series Lola Da Musica, and was released in the 1990s as a promo VHS. "Untitled #2" from Frusciante's Niandra Lades and Usually Just a T-Shirt album is featured on this film with a poem read over it. Also featured is an unreleased Frusciante song, which contains elements of another song named "Untitled #5" on his album Niandra LaDes and Usually Just a T-Shirt.

Soundtrack
All songs written by John Frusciante unless noted otherwise:

 Title unknown (unreleased Niandra-era recording) – 1:14
 "Running Away Into You" – 1:52
 "Untitled #2" (With poem) – 4:18
 "Untitled #3" – 1:48
 "Hallelujah" (Leonard Cohen) (Performed by John Cale) – 2:16

References

External links
 

1993 films
1990s short documentary films
Documentary films about rock music and musicians
Films directed by Johnny Depp
American short documentary films
1990s English-language films
1990s American films